The following individuals have held the position of Treasurer of the Law Society of Upper Canada (1797–2018) or the Law Society of Ontario (2018–present).

Treasurers of the Law Society of Upper Canada (1797–2018)
John White 1797–1798
Robert Isaac Dey Gray 1798–1801
Angus Macdonell	1801–1805
Thomas Scott	1805–1806
G. D'Arcy Boulton 1806–1811
William Warren Baldwin 1811–1815
G. D'Arcy Boulton	1815–1818
Sir John Robinson, 1st Baronet, of Toronto	1818–1819
Henry John Boulton	1819–1820
William Warren Baldwin	1820–1821
Sir John Robinson, 1st Baronet, of Toronto 1821–1822
Henry John Boulton	1822–1824
William Warren Baldwin	1824–1828
Sir John Robinson, 1st Baronet, of Toronto	1828–1829
George Ridout	1829–1832
William Warren Baldwin	1832–1836
Robert Baldwin Sullivan	1836
Robert Sympson Jameson	1836–1841
Levius Peters Sherwood	1841–1843
William Henry Draper	1843–1845
Robert Sympson Jameson	1845–1846
Henry John Boulton	1846–1847
Robert Baldwin	1847–1848
James Edward Small	1848–1849
Robert Easton Burns	1849–1850
John Godfrey Spragge	1850
Robert Baldwin	1850–1859
James Buchanan MacAulay	1859
John Hillyard Cameron	1859–1876
Stephen Richards	1876–1879
Edward Blake	1879–1893
Aemilius Irving	1893–1913
George Ferguson Shepley	1913–1916
John Hoskin	1916–1921
Featherston Osler 1921–1924
Frederick Weir Harcourt	1924–1927
Wallace Nesbitt	1927–1930
William Norman Tilley	1930–1935
Newton Rowell	1935–1936
Michael Herman Ludwig	1936–1937
Robert Spelman Robertson	1937–1939
D'Alton Lally McCarthy	1939–1944
John Shirley Denison	1944–1947
Gershom William Mason	1947–1950
Cyril Frederick Harshaw Carson	1950–1958
John Josiah Robinette	1958–1962
Joseph Sedgwick	1962–1963
John Douglas Arnup	1963–1966
Brendan O'Brien 1966–1968
William Goldwin Carrington Howland	1968–1970
Goldwin Arthur Martin	1970–1971
Sydney Lewis Robins	1971–1974
Stuart Douglas Thom	1974–1976
Wesley Gibson Gray	1976–1978
George Duncan Finlayson	1978–1980
John Douglas Bowlby	1980–1983
Brendan O'Brien 1983
Laura Legge	1983–1985
Pierre Genest	1985–1986
Arthur Richard Andrew Scace	1986–1987
William Daniel Chilcott	1987–1988
Laura Legge	1988
Lee Kenneth Ferrier	1988–1990
James MacDonald Spence	1990–1992
Allan Michael Rock	1992–1993
Paul Stephen Andrew Lamek	1993–1995
Eleanor Susan Elliott	1995–1997
Harvey Thomas Strosberg	1997–1999
Robert Patrick Armstrong	1999–2001
Vern Krishna	2001–2003
Frank Neal Stephen Marrocco	2003–2005
George Douglas Hunter	2005–2006
Clayton Ruby (interim treasurer) 2006
Gavin MacKenzie	2006–2008
Derry Millar	2008–2010
Laurie Pawlitza 2010–2012
Thomas G. Conway 2012–2014
Janet E. Minor 2014–2016
Paul Schabas 2016–2018

Treasurers of the Law Society of Ontario (2018–present)
Malcolm M. Mercer 2018–2020
Teresa Donnelly 2020–22
Jacqueline Horvat 2022–present

References 

Law Society